Maskoskanaw River is a tributary of Frontenac Lake (Milieu River), flowing into the unorganized territory of Lac-Ashuapmushuan, Quebec, in the Regional County Municipality (MRC) of Le Domaine-du-Roy, in the administrative region of Saguenay-Lac-Saint-Jean, in Quebec, in Canada.

The Maskoskanaw River flows successively into the townships of Huard and Buade. Forestry is the main economic activity of this valley; recreational tourism activities, second.

The forest road R0212 (East-West direction) cuts the middle of the course of the Milieu River (Normandin River). The route 451 linking La Tuque to Obedjiwan, Quebec passes south of Patterson Lake; several secondary road branches serving the surroundings of this head lake.

The surface of the Maskoskanaw River is usually frozen from early November to mid-May, however, safe ice movement is generally from mid-November to mid-April.

Geography

Toponymy 
The toponym "Maskoskanaw River" was formalized on September 6, 1984, at the Commission de toponymie du Québec.

Notes and references

See also 

Rivers of Saguenay–Lac-Saint-Jean
Le Domaine-du-Roy Regional County Municipality